Bhim Gurung (born 22 April 1981) is a Nepalese male sky runner, who won four races of the Skyrunning World Series international circuit, also setting the record in 2016 Kima Trophy.

Biography
In 2017 he was second in Sky Extreme World Cup behind the British Jonathan Albon.

World Cup wins

References

External links
Bhim Gurung profile at Trail Running Nepal

1981 births
Living people
Nepalese sky runners
Nepalese mountain runners
Trail runners
Gurung people